= Church tower =

Church tower may refer to:

- Bell tower, a tower that contains one or more bells, or that is designed to hold bells even if it has none
- Steeple, a tall tower on a building, topped by a spire and often incorporating a belfry and other components
